In Iceland, the Police is the national police force of Iceland. It is responsible for law enforcement throughout the country, except in Icelandic territorial waters which fall under the jurisdiction of the Icelandic Coast Guard. Police affairs in Iceland are the responsibility of the Ministry of Justice and are administered by the Office of the National Commissioner of the Police on behalf of the ministry. The organisation is divided into nine districts, the largest being the Reykjavík Metropolitan Police, which is responsible for the Capital Region and its total population of around 208,000 people.

History

Origins
The police can trace its origins to 1778 when the first traces of industry started to appear. Up until that time, the law had been enforced first by individuals permitted to do so by the Althing and then by sýslumenn (sheriffs) and other Royal proxies.

The first police chief was Rasmus Frydensberg, the town mayor, who hired two former soldiers, Ole Biørn and Vilhelm Nolte, as the first policemen. It was not until shortly after 1891 that policemen were hired in most of the other areas of Iceland.

Post 1900
In 1933 Alþingi passed the Police Act which provided state participation in financing of police forces. This was done mostly in response to the threat of a communist revolution, whose capabilities had become apparent in a violent attempt to force the decisions of the Reykjavík city council, where a large part of the police forces went out of action as a result of physical injury. The act also authorized the Minister of Justice and Ecclesiastical affairs to call out reserves in critical situations.

In 1972 the state took over command of law enforcement in Iceland, creating the National Police and in 1977 State Criminal Investigation Police started operations under a special Director. The State Investigation Police took over investigations of criminal activities that previously were under the control of the Reykjavík Criminal Court and police commissioners in the Capital Region. The National Commissioner of the Police was formed in 1997, and the State Criminal Investigation Police was decommissioned.

First and only shooting death
On December 2, 2013, a person died due to an armed police operation for the first and currently only time in Iceland's history. Police had responded to reports of shotgun fire in an apartment in Árbær, a Reykjavík suburb. Initially tear gas was used in an attempt to subdue the gunman, a 59-year-old man, but it failed to affect him.

When the special police unit entered the apartment in question, two officers were injured by shotgun fire. One officer was holding a ballistic shield which was hit. The other officer was hit in the head, but was wearing a ballistic helmet. Two officers with ballistic shields and pistols returned four shots, two of them striking the gunman. The gunman was taken to the hospital but pronounced dead upon arrival. National Police Commissioner Haraldur Johannessen immediately apologised to the man's family, calling the incident "unprecedented". The shooter's motives were not immediately clear, though some neighbours reported the gunman was making threats towards them. An investigation into this incident was launched, and the guns involved on all sides were seized. Counseling was offered to the officers involved. This still remains as the first and currently only shooting death involving the Icelandic Police in Iceland's history.

Second shooting
On the evening of August 26, 2021, a man armed with a shotgun and handgun started shooting at a car and house of the father of his girlfriends children in Egilsstaðir, small town in east Iceland. Police officers in Egilsstaðir responded armed with pistols. Officers repeatedly told the gunman to lay down his weapons and give up when he was inside the house. After about an hour, the man came out of the house and started shooting at the police officers taking cover behind cars in the driveway. One officer returned fire, striking the gunman in the chest. The gunman was quickly helped and transported by air ambulance to Reykjavík to be treated. The gunman survived and was sentenced to 8 years in prison. The incident marked the first time a normal police officer, not in the special armed police unit, fired a gun on duty.

2022 Iceland terror plot

On 21 September 2022, the police arrested four individuals who were suspected of alleged terrorist plot, the first of its kind in the country, to attack various institutions and citizens of the state.

Police academy
The police academy was shut down as of 30 September 2016 and the Ministry of Education, Science and Culture has decided to hand the responsibility of training future police officers to University of Akureyri. Until then the police academy was its own independent institution under the Ministry of Interior. The police academy had previously been a non-university educational institution.

This decision was quite controversial as it went against what a committee (established by Central Public Procurement ) had recommended, with training provided by the University of Iceland.

After the changes took place, cadets are now required to complete a two-year Police Science university diploma consisting of 120 ECTS credits. The practical training takes place at the Centre for Police Training and Professional Development , established June 1, 2016 to replace the police academy that was shut down the same year.

Ranks

Equipment

Uniform
The police wear black uniforms marked with traditional black and white checked markings and the police star. The working uniform varies from a traditional service uniform (shirt and trousers) to tactical overalls. The old traditional Icelandic service uniform is now used as a dress uniform. The trousers patrol officers use are made from a fire-resistant material.

Ranks

Weaponry

Although police officers carry only extendable batons and MK-4 OC-spray (pepper spray) whilst on duty, they are trained in the use of firearms and are issued firearms in certain situations. Most patrol vehicles are equipped with firearms in order to limit the response time needed in assignments that demand armed police. The firearms are stored in a special weapons locker. The special operations team, the Víkingasveitin, carry out their daily assignments armed.

Firearms

 Heckler & Koch MP5 Submachine gun
 Heckler & Koch G36 Assault rifle
 Blaser R93–7.62×51 NATO sniper rifle
 Steyr SSG 69 sniper rifle
 Glock 17 pistol
 Mossberg 500 shotgun
 Rheinmetall MG 3 General-purpose machine gun
 Browning M2 Heavy machine gun
 Brügger & Thomet LL06 Less-lethal weapon

Transport

In Iceland, police vehicles are white with the Icelandic word for "police", Lögreglan, written in blue letters.

Starting in Spring 2018, Volvo V90 Cross Country vehicles entered service with police districts across the country. The new vehicles were the first to use a new livery designed to improve visibility and were based on other European police vehicle liveries, retiring a livery that had been used by the Icelandic police since 2002.
The previous vehicle livery consisted of blue and red stripes with the police star overlaying the stripes on the front doors. All markings are made of reflective material and the emergency lights are all blue.

As of 2022 the regional districts own most of their cars while some of them are on long term rent from Bílaleiga Akureyrar. Previously the National Police Commissioner owned all of the police cars and the regional districts respectively rented them and paid both a per-kilometer fee and a fixed fee.  The most common police cars are the Volvo V90 CC, Skoda Octavia and Superb and Land Rover Discovery. The Víkingasveitin uses 4 unmarked Ford Police Interceptor Utility and unmarked Chevrolet Suburbans as well GMC Yukons that have been modified for tactical operations.

Vehicles currently used
 Mercedes-Benz Sprinter
 Volkswagen Transporter
 Mercedes-Benz Vito
 BMW R1200RT
 Ford Explorer
 Ford Ranger Raptor
 Ford Transit
 Ford Police Interceptor Utility
 Chevrolet Tahoe
 Chevrolet Suburban
 GMC Yukon
 Ram pickup
 Toyota Land Cruiser 120/150
 Yamaha FJR1300
 Nissan Patrol
 Hyundai Santa Fe
 Chevrolet Captiva
 Kia Sorento
 Volvo V70
 Volvo XC90
 Volvo V90 Cross Country
 Škoda Superb
 Škoda Octavia
 Škoda Kodiaq
 Land Rover Discovery

Vehicles previously used
 Ford E-Series
 Ford Bronco
 Ford Mondeo
 Ford Escort
 Dodge Ram van
 Chrysler Saratoga
 Chevrolet Captiva
 Chevrolet Malibu
 Chevrolet Van
 Chevrolet Scottsdale
 Plymouth Valiant
 Harley-Davidson FL
 Kawasaki KZ1000P Police
 Opel Omega
 Opel Vectra
 BMW 3 Series
 VW Caddy
 VW Passat
 Volvo S70
 Volvo S80
 Volvo XC70
 Volvo 140
 Volvo 240
 Volvo 460
 Volvo 744
 Volvo 850
 SAAB 900
 SAAB 9000
 Toyota Camry
 Toyota Hilux
 Toyota Hiace
 Toyota 4Runner
 Toyota Land Cruiser 60
 Toyota Land Cruiser 90
 Toyota Tercel 4WD
 Mitsubishi Galant
 Mitsubishi L300
 Mitsubishi Space Wagon
 Subaru 1800
 Subaru Legacy
 Subaru Forester
 Isuzu Trooper
 Mazda 929
 Škoda Octavia Scout
 Land Rover Defender
 Lada Sport
 UAZ SGR

Organisation
There are nine police districts in Iceland which follow the regions of Iceland with the addition of Vestmannaeyjar being its own district. The current police district division is stipulated by the Regulation on Police Districts of the Police Commissioner which was signed 4 December 2014 by Prime Minister Sigmundur Davíð Gunnlaugsson who acted as Minister of Justice temporarily within the Ministry of the Interior due to a scandal. The headquarters are administrative centres for their respective district and regular police stations.

Intelligence services 
This service was founded primarily to monitor Nazi scientists in Iceland as well as communists. After World War II, this service had the embassies of communist countries under surveillance and compiled lists of communist sympathizers and potential saboteurs or terrorists. It was not until 2006 that this service was officially acknowledged, after having been known to only a handful of men for more than 60 years, after historians were granted limited access to secret documents. 

The National Commissioner's National Security Unit, established in 2007, is currently responsible for internal intelligence activities which include evaluating threat to the constitution of the state such as terrorism or organized crime.

See also
Defence of Iceland
Directorate of Customs
Icelandic Prison Service

References

National Central Bureaus of Interpol
National law enforcement agencies of Iceland
National police forces